Cockwells is a hamlet in the civil parish of Ludgvan in Cornwall, England and situated on the A30 road north-east of the village of Crowlas.

References

Hamlets in Cornwall